Dendrochilium cootesii is an orchid species found only in the Philippines.

References

cootesii
Orchids of the Philippines
Plants described in 1997